Colonel Ernest Napper Tandy,  (13 May 1879 – 6 May 1953) was a British Army officer who played first-class cricket for Somerset in 1904 and 1905. He also played one first-class match for Marylebone Cricket Club (MCC) in 1908.

Cricket career
Educated at Wellington College, Tandy was a right-handed middle-order batsman. He made his first-class cricket debut in a single match for Somerset against Sussex in 1904, scoring eight in the only innings possible in a rain-ruined game. A year later, he reappeared in another single game, this time scoring 0 and 17 against Yorkshire. A fairly regular player of non-first-class cricket both for MCC and for other amateur sides, he played just one more first-class match and scored 26 and 30, his highest totals, in the match against Leicestershire at Lord's in 1908.

Military career
Tandy was a career army officer. He was a cadet at the Royal Military Academy, Woolwich and joined the Royal Artillery as a second lieutenant on 26 February 1898.

He fought in the Second Boer War, leaving Southampton for South Africa on the SS Canada in early February 1900. Promotion to lieutenant followed on 16 February 1901. He was mentioned in Sir Redvers Buller's report to Lord Roberts on the campaign: "2nd Lieutenant E. N. Tandy, No. 2 Company, Western Division, R.G.A., was specially mentioned to me for his services when detached with two 12-pr. Q.F. guns with a column under Lieut.-Colonel E. C. Bethune, 16th Lancers." The war ended in June 1902, and Tandy returned to the United Kingdom on the SS Syria two months later, arriving in Southampton in early September.

By 1904, Tandy was a captain and he was appointed adjutant at the Ordnance College at Woolwich in that year. By 1915, he was a major within the Royal Artillery and the following year he was a temporary lieutenant-colonel. At the end of the First World War he was temporarily promoted to be a brigadier-general and by this time he was invested with  the Distinguished Service Order and was invested as a Companion of the Order of St Michael and St George. The temporary elevation ended at the end of 1919 and Tandy retired from the army in 1921 and was placed in the reserve of officers with the honorary rank of brigadier-general. He finally retired from the reserve list in 1934.

References

1879 births
1953 deaths
English cricketers
Somerset cricketers
Marylebone Cricket Club cricketers
British Army personnel of World War I
Companions of the Order of St Michael and St George
Companions of the Distinguished Service Order
People from Axbridge
People educated at Wellington College, Berkshire
Graduates of the Royal Military Academy, Woolwich